Floyd Lamb Park at Tule Springs is a  park in Las Vegas, Nevada. The park is centered on Tule Springs, a series of small lakes that formed an oasis in this part of the Mojave Desert. One of the larger urban retreats in the Las Vegas Valley, Tule Springs was once considered to be far out of town but is now encroached by development.  The park includes the Tule Springs Ranch, Tule Springs Archaeological Site, Tule Springs Wash and four ponds available for fishing.

History 

The springs was first designated as a park when it was acquired by the city of Las Vegas in 1964.  It was renamed Floyd Lamb State Park in 1977 when the state assumed control.  The park was named after Nevada state senator Floyd Lamb, who was later convicted of taking a $23,000 bribe from an undercover FBI agent in 1983.

The city took control of the park for a second time when the legislature and state in 2005 agreed to release control and ownership of Floyd Lamb State Park to the City of Las Vegas. The park was transferred to the city, on July 2, 2007 and renamed to Floyd Lamb Park at Tule Springs.

Lakes 
There are four lakes at the park that are stocked for fishing.  Tule Springs Lake is the largest of the lakes in the park followed by, Mulberry Lake, then Cottonwood Lake, and then Desert Willow Lake. In addition to abundant fishing, the lake area is home to a diverse population of anatidae and ardeidae.

References

External links 

City of Las Vegas parks webpage

Tourist attractions in the Las Vegas Valley
Parks in Nevada
Geography of Las Vegas
Parks in Clark County, Nevada